Prakash Nair is an American school architect, entrepreneur, writer and public speaker who advocates for open classrooms in schools.

Nair is the founding president of Education Design International (EDI) and a former founding president of Fielding Nair International (FNI), now known as Fielding International. Fielding International designs public and private schools and colleges across the globe. Their projects have won industry design awards for excellence, including the James D. MacConnell Award — the highest award conferred by the Association for Learning Environments, A4LE — for Dr. Phinnize J. Fisher Middle School in Greenville, South Carolina (2015) and for the Reece High School in Tasmania, Australia (2003).

Nair has written about school design and co-authored three books, Blueprint for Tomorrow: Redesigning Schools for Student-Centered Learning, Learning by Design: Live Play Engage Create, and The Language of School Design: Design Patterns for 21st Century Schools. His opinion on educational design issues has been sought by news media and by boards of education.

References

Works

External links 
 
 Fielding International website
 Education Design International (EDI) website

Year of birth missing (living people)
Living people
Place of birth missing (living people)
21st-century American architects